Khyber Pakhtunkhwa cricket team is a domestic cricket team in Pakistan representing the Khyber Pakhtunkhwa province. It competes in domestic first-class, List A and T20 cricket tournaments, namely the Quaid-e-Azam Trophy, Pakistan Cup and National T20 Cup. The team is operated by the Khyber Pakhtunkhwa Cricket Association.

History

Before 2019

As the North-West Frontier Province (NWFP), the team played its inaugural season in the Ranji Trophy in 1937. After the independence of Pakistan, NWFP competed in the Quaid-e-Azam Trophy sporadically from 1953–54 to 1978–79, and in the Pentangular Cup and Pakistan Cup. In 2010, the province was renamed "Khyber Pakhtunkhwa" and the team name changed accordingly. The team used Peshawar Club Ground as a home ground since 1938 until it was replaced by Arbab Niaz Stadium in 1985.

Since 2019
A new Khyber Pakhtunkhwa team was introduced as a part of the new domestic structure announced by the Pakistan Cricket Board (PCB) on 31 August 2019.

Structure

As of 2019, domestic cricket in Pakistan was reorganised into six regional teams (on provincial lines). A three tier bottom-up system is in operation with the Tier 1 teams participating in the Quaid-e-Azam Trophy (First Class), Pakistan Cup (List A) and National T20 Cup (Regional T20). The Tier 2 teams participate in the City Cricket Association Tournament whilst the Tier 3 teams participate in various local tournaments as both tiers feed players to the Tier 1 team. 
 Tier 1: Khyber Pakhtunkhwa
 Tier 2: Peshawar, Nowshehra, Charsadda, Swat, Lower Dir, Mardan, Abbottabad, Mansehra, Haripur, Swabi, Upper Dir, Buner, Khyber, Mamond, Kohat, Kurram, D.I.Khan, Bannu & Mohmand.
 Tier 3: Various Clubs & Schools.

Season summaries

2019/20 season 
Khyber Pakhtunkhwa finished in third and fourth place respectively in the Quaid-e-Azam Trophy and National T20 Cup. The Pakistan Cup was cancelled this season due to the Covid-19 pandemic.

2020/21 season 
The team won the treble being declared champions of the Quaid-e-Azam Trophy, Pakistan Cup and the National T20 Cup. The final against Central Punjab (Quaid-e-Azam Trophy) resulted in a tie, and they were declared joint winners.

2021/22 season
Khyber Pakhtunkhwa won their second National T20 Cup by defeating Central Punjab in the final.

Current squad
Players with international caps are listed in bold.

References

Pakistani first-class cricket teams
Cricket in Khyber Pakhtunkhwa